The AVC qualification for the 2018 FIVB Volleyball Men's World Championship saw member nations compete for four places at the finals in Italy and Bulgaria.

Pools composition
23 AVC national teams entered qualification. But, Afghanistan and Turkmenistan later withdrew and India later were excluded because of FIVB's suspension of the Volleyball Federation of India.

Subzonal round
Central Asia decided to hold the subzonal round with the bottom five ranked teams in Central Asia from the FIVB World Ranking as of October 2015. But, Afghanistan and Turkmenistan later withdrew. Rankings are shown in brackets.

Zonal round
The top three ranked teams in Central Asia from the FIVB World Ranking as of October 2015 automatically qualified for the zonal round. But, India later were excluded because of FIVB's suspension of the Volleyball Federation of India. Rankings are shown in brackets.

Final round
The top five ranked teams from the FIVB World Ranking as of October 2015 automatically qualified for the final round. The top four ranked teams seeded by serpentine system, while the other six teams were drawn in Bangkok, Thailand on 19 March 2017. Rankings are shown in brackets.

Pool standing procedure
 Number of matches won
 Match points
 Sets ratio
 Points ratio
 If the tie continues as per the point ratio between two teams, the priority will be given to the team which won the last match between them. When the tie in points ratio is between three or more teams, a new classification of these teams in the terms of points 1, 2 and 3 will be made taking into consideration only the matches in which they were opposed to each other.

Match won 3–0 or 3–1: 3 match points for the winner, 0 match points for the loser
Match won 3–2: 2 match points for the winner, 1 match point for the loser

Subzonal round
The winners qualified for the zonal round.

Central Asia
Venue:  Gazprom Sports and Recreation Center, Cholpon-Ata, Kyrgyzstan
Dates: 15–17 September 2016
All times are Kyrgyzstan Time (UTC+06:00).

|}

|}

Zonal round
The winners in each pool qualified for the final round.

Central Asia
Venue:  Gazprom Sports and Recreation Center, Bishkek, Kyrgyzstan
Dates: 26–28 May 2017
All times are Kyrgyzstan Time (UTC+06:00).

|}

|}

Eastern Asia
Eastern Asia decided to replace the tournament with the FIVB World Ranking as of 22 August 2016. Rankings are shown in brackets.

Oceania
Venue:  Vodafone Arena, Suva, Fiji
Dates: 27–29 October 2016
All times are Fiji Standard Time (UTC+12:00).

|}

|}

Southeastern Asia
Venue:  Nakhon Pathom Gymnasium, Nakhon Pathom, Thailand
Dates: 7–9 October 2016
All times are Indochina Time (UTC+07:00).

|}

|}

Western Asia
Western Asia decided to replace the tournament with the FIVB World Ranking as of 22 August 2016. Rankings are shown in brackets.

Final round
The top two teams in each pool qualified for the 2018 World Championship.

Pool A
Venue:  Rezazadeh Stadium, Ardabil, Iran
Dates: 10–14 August 2017
All times are Iran Daylight Time (UTC+04:30).

|}

|}

Pool B
Venue:  AIS Arena, Canberra, Australia
Dates: 12–16 July 2017
All times are Australian Eastern Standard Time (UTC+10:00).

|}

|}

References

External links
Official website of the Final Round
Final Round Pool A regulations
Final Round Pool A squads
Final Round Pool B regulations
Final Round Pool B squads
Official website of the Southeastern Asia Zonal Round

2018 FIVB Volleyball Men's World Championship
2016 in volleyball
2017 in men's volleyball